Newman Tuttle House is a historic home located at Lacona in Oswego County, New York.  It was built about 1871 and is a two-story, clapboard vernacular residence consisting of a rectangular, three-bay main block and a slightly lower rear wing, both with shallow pitched gable roofs.

It was listed on the National Register of Historic Places in 1988.

References

Houses on the National Register of Historic Places in New York (state)
Houses completed in 1871
Houses in Oswego County, New York
National Register of Historic Places in Oswego County, New York